Hazard is a 1948 American comedy drama film starring Paulette Goddard and Macdonald Carey, and directed by George Marshall.

Plot

A compulsive gambler, Ellen Crane owes a large debt to Lonnie Burns, a club owner. He cuts a deck of cards with her—if she wins, Burns will forget the IOU, but if she loses, Ellen must marry him. She loses.

Ellen leaves town. A furious Burns hires private eye JD Storm, who tracks her to Chicago. She wins enough money there gambling to continue to Los Angeles, but first finds Storm waiting in her hotel room. She gets the better of him and flees.

An ex-con named Beady takes her to a craps game, where both are arrested. Storm shows up and pays their bail on the condition Ellen return east with him. Storm falls for her along the way, even after Ellen pulls a fast one and has him arrested for abducting her against her will.

Storm talks his way out of that fix. Ellen crashes the car, which catches fire. Storm saves her but is hurt. Ellen goes to Las Vegas but returns to Storm, who wants a justice of the peace to marry them. She feels betrayed when Burns turns up, but Storm fights for her. He proves that Burns won the card-cut with a crooked deck, and he and Ellen are free to get on with their lives.

Cast
 Paulette Goddard as Ellen Crane
 Macdonald Carey as JD Storm
 Fred Clark as Lonnie Burns 
 Stanley Clements as Joe Zinkle
 Percy Helton as Beady Robbins (as Percey Helton)
 Maxie Rosenbloom as Truck Driver 
 Frank Fenton as Utah Sheriff Bob Waybill 
 Frank Faylen as Oscar
 Mary Adams as Matron, Sergeant 
 Walter Baldwin as Alfred Clumby, Bookie
 Isabel Randolph as Goldie, Woman in Hotel
 Taylor Holmes as Mr. Meeler
 Charles McGraw as Chick
 Ruth Clifford as Waitress (uncredited)
 James Millican as Houseman

References

External links
 

1948 films
American comedy-drama films
Films directed by George Marshall
Films about gambling
Films scored by Frank Skinner
1948 comedy-drama films
American black-and-white films
Paramount Pictures films
1940s American films